Songs from the South - Volume 2 (Paul Kelly 98–08) is the second greatest hits album by Australian singer-songwriter Paul Kelly. It was released on 10 November 2008 by the EMI label.

In 1997, Paul Kelly released Songs from the South, which featured hit songs from 1985 to 1997. Songs from the South - Volume 2 comprises songs from Kelly's catalogue from 1998 to 2008 (including his solo albums such as Words and Music, Nothing But a Dream, Ways & Means, and Stolen Apples), as well as some from his collaborative efforts (such as Stardust Five and Professor Ratbaggy). It also includes a crowd favourite, "Every Fucking City", from the Roll on Summer EP, as well as two previously unreleased songs: "Thoughts in the Middle of the Night", and a tribute to Australian cricketer Shane Warne (to the tune of "London Is the Place for Me" by Lord Kitchener).

Songs for the South Volume 1 and Volume 2 were also released as a combined double album and as a limited (2,000) collectors box set, together with a DVD, Paul Kelly – The Video Collection 1985-2008 (a collection of Kelly's videos made over the past 23 years together with several live performances); a rare tour poster; a vintage T-shirt; three replica back stage passes; and a facsimile of the original hand written lyrics to "How to Make Gravy", individually signed by Kelly.

The album debuted on the ARIA Albums Chart at No. 25 and peaked at No. 22.

Track listing

Charts

Weekly charts

Year-end charts

Certifications

References

Further reading
 Reviews Paul Kelly's Songs from the South and Songs from the South Volume 2.

2008 greatest hits albums
Paul Kelly (Australian musician) albums
Compilation albums by Australian artists